The 2013–14 Cypriot Third Division was the 43rd season of the Cypriot third-level football league. Elpida Xylofagou won their 2nd title.

Format
Fourteen teams participated in the 2013–14 Cypriot Third Division. All teams played against each other twice, once at their home and once away. The team with the most points at the end of the season crowned champions. The first two teams were promoted to the 2014–15 Cypriot Second Division and the last three teams were relegated to the 2014–15 Cypriot Fourth Division.

Point system
Teams received three points for a win, one point for a draw and zero points for a loss.

Changes from previous season
Teams promoted to 2013–14 Cypriot Second Division
 Karmiotissa Polemidion
 Enosis Neon Parekklisia
 Digenis Oroklinis
 ASIL Lysi

Teams relegated from 2012–13 Cypriot Second Division
 Akritas Chlorakas 
 Ethnikos Assia

Teams promoted from 2012–13 Cypriot Fourth Division
 MEAP Nisou
 Finikas Ayias Marinas
 THOI Lakatamia
 Konstantios & Evripidis Trachoniou

Teams relegated to 2013–14 Cypriot Fourth Division
 Frenaros FC
 Atromitos Yeroskipou

Stadia and locations

League standings

Results

See also
 Cypriot Third Division
 2013–14 Cypriot First Division
 2013–14 Cypriot Cup for lower divisions

Sources

Cypriot Third Division seasons
Cyprus
2013–14 in Cypriot football